Pierre Vercheval (born November 22, 1964) is a former all star offensive lineman in the Canadian Football League.

Vercheval played his university football at the University of Western Ontario, where he won the J. P. Metras Trophy top lineman in Canadian university football in 1987. He tried out with the New England Patriots of the NFL, unsuccessfully, and signed with the Edmonton Eskimos in 1988, beginning a 14-year CFL career.

He played five seasons in Edmonton, then moved to the Toronto Argonauts for four seasons, from 1993 to 1997 (68 total games.) He was an all star three times and was part of the Argonauts powerful back-to-back Grey Cup winners of 1996 and 1997. He finished his career with the Montreal Alouettes, from 1998 to 2001 (78 games) being named an all star three more times and winning the CFL's Most Outstanding Offensive Lineman Award in 2000. In 2007, he became the first francophone to be inducted into the Canadian Football Hall of Fame.

Always a fan favorite in predominantly Francophone Montreal, fully bilingual Vercheval is currently enjoying a successful second career as a football commentator on the French-language RDS television station alongside Pierre Durivage (2002), Denis Casavant (2003-2013) and David Arsenault (since 2014).

Notes and references

1964 births
Belgian emigrants to Canada
Canadian Football League announcers
Canadian Football Hall of Fame inductees
Canadian football offensive linemen
Edmonton Elks players
Living people
Montreal Alouettes players
Sportspeople from Liège
Players of Canadian football from Quebec
Toronto Argonauts players
Western Mustangs football players
Belgian players of Canadian football